Kamal Patel (born 6 October 1961) is an Indian politician and a member of the Bharatiya Janata Party. He has served as a Member of the Madhya Pradesh Legislative Assembly five times in 1993, 1998, 2003, 2008, and 2018 representing the Harda Constituency. On 21 April 2020, he was appointed as the Cabinet Minister and currently serves as the Minister of Agriculture in the Government of Madhya Pradesh.

Political career
Patel has been associated with Akhil Bhartiya Vidyarthi Parishad, a student union affiliated with the BJP since his days as a student. He was president of Bharatiya Janata Yuva Morcha Hoshangabad. Later, he was made state general secretary of BJP Yuva Morcha then also became state president of BJP Yuva morcha.

He has been elected on five occasions as a Member of the Legislative Assembly of Madhya Pradesh from Harda constituency. Those successes came in the consecutive elections of 1993, 1998, 2003, 2008, 2018.

1989 – member of Madhya Pradesh BJP state executive committee.
1993 – elected MLA from Harda constituency.
1998 – elected MLA from Harda constituency.
2003 – elected MLA from Harda constituency.
2005 – state minister (independent charge) of Medical Education, Technical Education and Training with effect from 1 June 2005
2008 –  elected MLA from Harda constituency.
2009 –  Cabinet Minister and given the charge of Revenue, Religious Trust and Endowment, and Rehabilitation Departments
2013 - Lost VidhanSabha Election
2018 – elected MLA from Harda constituency.

Minister Of Madhya Pradesh
Patel was made state minister (independent charge) of Medical Education, Technical Education and Training with effect from 1 June 2005 in the Babulal Gaur-led government. Later he was promoted to rank of cabinet minister and given the charge of revenue, religious trust and endowment, and rehabilitation departments in the government of Shivraj Singh Chouhan.

On 21 April 2020 he again became a cabinet minister.

References

Further reading

1961 births
Living people
Bharatiya Janata Party politicians from Madhya Pradesh
People from Harda
Madhya Pradesh MLAs 1993–1998
Madhya Pradesh MLAs 1998–2003
Madhya Pradesh MLAs 2003–2008
Madhya Pradesh MLAs 2008–2013
Madhya Pradesh MLAs 2018–2023